The 1972 RAC Wiggins Teape Paperchase British Saloon Car Championship was the 15th season of the championship. Bill McGovern became the first driver to win three BTCC titles, making it three back-to-back titles with his Sunbeam Imp.

Calendar and winners
All races were held in the United Kingdom. Overall winners in bold.

Championship results

References

British Touring Car Championship seasons
Saloon